Westminster is a village 98 km east of Bloemfontein and 40 km west of Ladybrand. It was founded after the Second Anglo-Boer War (1899-1902) by the Duke of Westminster to settle British ex-soldiers, and named after him.

References

Populated places in Mangaung